Lasse Boesen (born 18 September 1979) is a retired Danish team handball player. He is European Champion by winning the 2008 European Men's Handball Championship with the Danish national handball team.   He received a bronze medal at the 2007 World Championships.

References

External links
 Lasse Boesen on the website of SG Flensburg-Handewitt Player profile

1979 births
Living people
People from Kolding Municipality
Danish male handball players
Olympic handball players of Denmark
Handball players at the 2008 Summer Olympics
Handball players at the 2012 Summer Olympics
SG Flensburg-Handewitt players
SDC San Antonio players
KIF Kolding players
Sportspeople from the Region of Southern Denmark